Haukeland is a surname, likely of Norwegian origin. Notable people with the surname include:

Andreas Haukeland (born 1993), better known as Tix, Norwegian singer
Arnold Haukeland (1920-1983), Norwegian sculptor
Henrik Haukeland (born 1994), Norwegian professional ice hockey player
Mons Haukeland (1892-1983), Norwegian gymnastics teacher and military officer

See also
Hege Haukeland Liadal (born 1972), Norwegian politician and fraudster
Haukeland University Hospital, a hospital in Bergen, Norway